Yuli Solomonovich Gusman (born 8 August 1943) is a Soviet, Russian and Azerbaijani film director and actor. He is the founder and CEO of the Nika Award.

Life and career 
Yuli Gusman was born in Baku, Azerbaijan to military physician Solomon Gusman and professor Lola Barsuk, who later became a translator and professor at the Azerbaijan University of Languages. His brother Mikhail is the vice-president of the Information Telegraph Agency of Russia. In 1966 Yuli Gusman graduated from the Azerbaijan Medical University, majoring in therapeutics, and in 1970 earned a master's degree in Psychology and Psychiatry. He wrote a research paper to defend a thesis for another medical degree, but chose not to do so after being admitted to the Higher Film Directing Courses at Goskino. Upon graduating in 1976 he worked at Azerbaijanfilm where he created and directed stage performances and was the director of the satirical newsreel Mozalan. In the 1970s and the 1980s he worked as manager and director of the Azerbaijan State Theatre of Musical Comedy and the Song Theatre. He has directed seven films, including outside the Soviet Union (in the United States, Japan and China).

In 1965–1972 he was head of Baku's KVN team. He introduced the uniform practice for all KVN teams. In 1993 he was elected to the State Duma of the first convocation (1993–1995). In 1988–2002 Gusman was chairman of the Cinematography Centre (Dom Kino) in Moscow. In 1996–2000 he hosted the primetime talk-show Tema and the weekly talk-show Vecher s Yuliem Gusmanom ("An Evening with Yuli Gusman") on Channel One (Russia). In 1996 he founded and became one of the CEOs of the Russian Jewish Congress. In 2004 he was awarded with the Order of Friendship.

He is married to Valida Gusman, a French language teacher and lecturer in the Slavic Languages Department at Georgetown University. They have a daughter named Lola and a grandson named Maximilian.

Notable filmography

As a director 
 On One Fine Day (В один прекрасный день, Azerbaijanfilm, 1977)
 Cottage for a Family (Дачный домик для одной семьи, Azerbaijanfilm, 1978)
 Don't Be Afraid, I Am Here For You (Не бойся, я с тобой, Azerbaijanfilm, 1981)
 Ice Floe In The Warm Sea (Льдина в тёплом море, 1986)
 The Soviet Period Park (Парк советского периода, Slovo, 2006)
 Don't Be Afraid, I Am Here For You! 1919 (Не бойся, я с тобой! 1919, Azerbaijanfilm, WaiT Media, 2011)

As an actor 
Nastya (Mosfilm, 1993), as TV-host
The Soviet Period Park (Slovo, 2006), as himself

References

External links 

 

Russian male actors
Russian film directors
Soviet film directors
Azerbaijani film directors
1943 births
Living people
Film people from Baku
Azerbaijani Jews
First convocation members of the State Duma (Russian Federation)
Echo of Moscow radio presenters
High Courses for Scriptwriters and Film Directors alumni
Academicians of the Russian Academy of Cinema Arts and Sciences "Nika"
Russian actor-politicians
Honored Art Workers of the Azerbaijan SSR